Anhui cuisine, alternatively referred to as Hui cuisine, is one of the Eight Culinary Traditions of Chinese cuisine. It is derived from the native cooking styles of the Huangshan region in southern Anhui Province.

Methods and ingredients
Anhui cuisine is known for its use of wild herbs, from both the land and the sea, and simple methods of preparation. Braising and stewing are common cooking techniques. Frying and stir frying are used much less frequently in Anhui cuisine than in other Chinese culinary traditions. Anhui cuisine consists of three styles: the Yangtze River region, Huai River region, and southern Anhui region. Anhui has ample uncultivated fields and forests, so the wild herbs used in the region's cuisine are readily available. Anhui cuisine is heavily associated with tofu, with Chinese folklore crediting the creation of tofu to the Han dynasty prince Liu An who hailed from Shou County (dubbed the "hometown of tofu"). According to Chinese legend, stinky tofu was created by Anhuinese scholar Wang Zhihe who sold his product in Beijing to make a living after failing the imperial examination. Anhui is the home of hairy tofu where it is a popular snack.

Notable dishes in Anhui cuisine

See also
List of Chinese dishes

References

Regional cuisines of China
Chinese cuisine